Charlotte Lucy Gainsbourg (born 21 July 1971) is an English-French actress and singer. She is the daughter of English actress and singer Jane Birkin and French singer Serge Gainsbourg. After making her musical debut with her father on the song "Lemon Incest" at the age of 12, she released an album with her father at the age of 15. More than 20 years passed before Gainsbourg released albums as an adult (5:55, IRM, Stage Whisper and Rest) to commercial and critical success. She has also appeared in many films, including the "Depression" trilogy directed by Lars von Trier, and has received a César Award and the Cannes Film Festival Best Actress Award.

Background 

Gainsbourg was born on 21 July 1971 in the Marylebone area of Central London to English actress and singer Jane Birkin and French musician Serge Gainsbourg. Gainsbourg was born at the height of her parents' fame; they had made headlines several years earlier with the sexually explicit song "Je t'aime... moi non plus" and by that point had become notorious for their turbulent relationship and multiple artistic collaborations. As a result, her birth and childhood were well publicised.

At birth, she received the surname of Gainsbourg, her father's stage name, but at the age of 18 she changed her surname to Ginsburg, her father's legal surname. She has continued to use the Gainsbourg name professionally.

Her maternal grandmother was actress Judy Campbell, and her uncle is screenwriter Andrew Birkin, who directed her in The Cement Garden. She is a cousin of theatre and opera director Sophie Hunter. Gainsbourg's father was Jewish, whereas her mother is from a Protestant background. Gainsbourg attended École Active Bilingue Jeannine Manuel in Paris and Collège Alpin International Beau Soleil in Switzerland. French is Gainsbourg's first language, but she is also fluent in English.

Gainsbourg was raised in Paris alongside her half-sister, Kate Barry, from her mother's marriage to composer John Barry. Kate Barry died in 2013 after falling out of a window. According to Birkin, both parents were somewhat neglectful, often spending their nights going out to parties and drinking. She has a young brother, Lucien "Lulu" Gainsbourg, born in 1986 from her father's relationship with Bambou. On her father's side she also had two older siblings born from his second marriage to Françoise-Antoinette "Béatrice" Pancrazzi.

By 1980, her parents' relationship had dissolved and her mother left her father for the director Jacques Doillon. Her half-sister, Lou Doillon, was born in 1982 as a result of the union. Gainsbourg would go on to work with her stepfather in the film The Temptation of Isabelle in 1985 and later in Amoureuse in 1992, which also starred her future partner Yvan Attal.

In 1987, she was the target of a bungled kidnapping.

After her parents separated, Gainsbourg's father descended into alcoholism, eventually dying of a heart attack in 1991. Gainsbourg remained devoted to preserving his legacy and preserved his home, saying she hoped to eventually turn it into a museum. She eventually abandoned the project and decided to maintain the house as a private residence instead.

Career

Acting 
Gainsbourg grew up on film sets, as both of her parents were involved in the film industry. She stated that her mother had pushed her into acting, believing that she wanted to be an actress and encouraging her to make her motion picture debut playing Catherine Deneuve's daughter in the film Paroles et Musique (1984).

In 1986, Gainsbourg won a César Award for "Most Promising Actress" for An Impudent Girl. That same year Gainsbourg appeared in the film Charlotte for Ever about a man who develops incestuous desires for his teenage daughter after his wife dies. Written and directed by Gainsbourg's father Serge Gainsbourg, who also took the role of Gainsbourg's father on screen, the film heightened the controversy that had resulted from Gainsbourg's debut single Lemon Incest, which had similar themes and also was created and sung with her father Serge causing press speculation that the material was autobiographical.

In 1988, she appeared together with her mother in a set of films Kung Fu Master and the documentary drama Jane B. by Agnes V., both directed by Agnès Varda. In 1993, Gainsbourg made her English-speaking debut in The Cement Garden, written and directed by her uncle, Andrew Birkin. Her stage debut was in 1994, in David Mamet's Oleanna at the Théâtre de la Gaîté-Montparnasse. In 1996, Gainsbourg starred as the title character in Jane Eyre, a film adaption of Charlotte Brontë's 1847 novel. In 2000, she won the César Award for "Best Supporting Actress" for the film La Bûche.

In 2003, Gainsbourg starred in 21 Grams, with Naomi Watts, Sean Penn and Benicio del Toro. In 2006, Gainsbourg appeared alongside Gael García Bernal in Michel Gondry's The Science of Sleep. In 2007, she appeared as Claire in the Todd Haynes-directed Bob Dylan biographical film I'm Not There, also contributing a cover version of the Dylan song "Just Like a Woman" to the film soundtrack. In 2009, she won the award for Best Actress at the 2009 Cannes Film Festival for the film Antichrist. Gainsbourg starred in the French/Australian production The Tree, released in 2010, and in Lars von Trier's science fiction disaster film Melancholia. She was on the jury for the 62nd Berlin International Film Festival in February 2012. In May 2012, Confession of a Child of the Century premiered, in which she starred alongside the British musician Pete Doherty.

Gainsbourg worked with von Trier once again on his 2013 film Nymphomaniac, in which she played the title role. The 5½-hour film depicts the life of a sex addict from youth to middle age. Regarding her reservations about the part, Gainsbourg commented, "The sex scenes weren't so hard. For me, it was all the masochistic scenes. Those were embarrassing and, yes, a little humiliating."

In 2014, she starred in Three Hearts and Olivier Nakache & Éric Toledano film Samba, for which she was nominated for a Lumières Award for Best Actress. She then played Dr. Catherine Marceaux in Independence Day: Resurgence, sequel of the 1996 film Independence Day. In 2017, she starred alongside Michael Fassbender and Rebecca Ferguson in the crime thriller film The Snowman. In 2020, she had a cameo role playing herself in the first episode of the fourth season of Call My Agent!

Music 

Gainsbourg made her musical debut on the controversial song "Lemon Incest" in 1984. Sung by Gainsbourg and her father Serge, the lyrics implied a pedophiliac relationship between a father and daughter and led people to believe that the material was autobiographical. Gainsbourg, who was 13 at the time of the song's release, later stated that she had just begun boarding school and was therefore unaware of the controversy regarding the song until she was much older.

In 1986, she released her debut album Charlotte for Ever, which was produced by her father. In 2000, Gainsbourg was featured on the Madonna album Music on the track "What It Feels Like for a Girl". The lengthy spoken introduction by Gainsbourg is taken from the film The Cement Garden, which inspired the title of the song. The track was further remixed for a single version in 2001, with Gainsbourg's The Cement Garden speech repeated during the song.

In 2000, Gainsbourg was featured on the Soundwalk Collective with Patti Smith album Peradam on the track "The Four Cardinal Times".

In 2004, she sang a duet with French pop star Étienne Daho on his single "If". In 2006, Gainsbourg released her second album 5:55 to critical acclaim and commercial success, reaching the top spot on the French charts and achieving platinum status in that country. In the UK, the album was moderately successful, reaching No. 78. (The single "The Songs That We Sing" only achieved No. 129.) Gainsbourg attributed the twenty-year break between her debut album and 5:55 to her father's death and her reluctance to explore a musical career without him.

In late 2009, Gainsbourg released her third studio album, IRM, which was produced by Beck. One of the influential factors in the album's creative process was her time spent filming Antichrist. Gainsbourg's head injury in 2007 influenced the title of the album "IRM", an abbreviation for the French translation of magnetic resonance imaging (MRI). During her brain scan, she began to think about music. "When I was inside that machine," she said, "it was an escape to think about music. It's rhythm. It was very chaotic."

Her song "Heaven Can Wait" was chosen as the Starbucks iTunes Pick of the Week on 2 March 2010. Her song "Trick Pony" appeared at the beginning of the Grey's Anatomy episode "Perfect Little Accident" (Season 6, Episode 16/airdate: 25 February 2010), is featured on the FIFA 11 soundtrack and was used in the 2012 Teleflora Super Bowl advertisement featuring supermodel Adriana Lima.

In 2011, Gainsbourg released the double album Stage Whisper, a collection of unreleased songs from IRM and live tracks. In 2013, Gainsbourg released a cover version of the song "Hey Joe", recorded with Beck, for the soundtrack of the film Nymphomaniac, in which she was the lead actress. Her music influenced artists such as Tove Lo, who cited the simplicity and quirky lyrical content of Charlotte's IRM as the main inspiration behind her career in music and said that it "opened a new world" for her as regards sound, and she performed a bilingual cover of "The Maiden's Prayer" in French and English as the opening tune for the Anglo-French crime thriller television serial The Tunnel. 

Since 2014, Gainsbourg has been supporting the Hear the World Foundation as ambassador. In her role she advocates for equal opportunities and a better quality of life for people with hearing loss. She was featured in the Hear the World Calendar 2014, the proceeds of which were to benefit the foundation's projects.

Gainsbourg worked for four years, mainly in New York, with producer Sebastian Akchoté (known as SebastiAn) on her fifth studio album, titled Rest. Rest is a portrayal of her feelings after her father Serge Gainsbourg and her half-sister Kate Barry's death, with the theme of alcohol addiction. About the album, she said "The album took a different direction. I wanted to express [my grief] not only with sadness but with anger." The lyrics are in English and French. In September 2017, music videos for the singles "Rest" and "Deadly Valentine" were released, both are directed by Gainsbourg herself. The music videos feature her children. The album was released on 17 November 2017. A companion EP for Rest was released the following year, titled Take 2. Gainsbourg additionally featured on Akchoté's second studio album Thirst in November 2019.

Throughout late November 2020, Gainsbourg posted images to social media of her in the recording studio with Irish-Scottish music producer Salvador Navarrete, known better by his stage name Sega Bodega. Navarrete described the sessions as "sounding beautiful". It was unveiled in September 2021 that Gainsbourg would appear on Navarrete's second studio album, Romeo, which was released on 12 November 2021. It is expected that more music between the two will be released.

Personal life 
Gainsbourg's longtime partner is French-Israeli actor/director Yvan Attal whom she met on the set of the 1991 film Aux yeux du monde. Gainsbourg and Attal are not married, and Gainsbourg has attributed her reluctance to do so to the fact that her parents never married. Attal publicly proposed to Gainsbourg on 19 June 2013, during an awards ceremony when he received the French National Order of Merit. In April 2014, Attal confirmed that they were still unwed, with no plans to marry. Together they have three children: a son, Ben (b. 1997), and daughters Alice (b. 2002) and Jo (b. 2011). Gainsbourg identifies as Jewish and celebrates Jewish holidays with her husband's family.

Gainsbourg was born in London, but she spent most of her life in Paris until the death of her sister Kate Barry. In 2013, she and her family relocated to New York City. They returned to Paris in 2020. She considers herself proud of both her nationalities.

On 5 September 2007, Gainsbourg underwent surgery for a cerebral hemorrhage. She had been experiencing headaches since a waterskiing accident in the United States several weeks earlier.

Filmography

Discography

Studio albums

Awards and nominations 
 Officer of the Order of Arts and Letters (2016)

References

External links 
 
 
 Charlotte Gainsbourg's Interviews in English
 Charlotte Gainsbourg at The Guardian
 
 Interview with Jean-Paul Enthoven, L'Officiel, September 2001

Living people
1971 births
20th-century English actresses
20th-century French actresses
21st-century British women singers
21st-century English actresses
21st-century French actresses
Actresses from London
Actresses from Paris
Atlantic Records artists
Because Music artists
Best Actress Bodil Award winners
Best Supporting Actress César Award winners
Birkin family
Cannes Film Festival Award for Best Actress winners
École Jeannine Manuel alumni
English child actresses
English child singers
English emigrants to France
English film actresses
English people of French descent
English people of Russian-Jewish descent
English women in electronic music
French child actresses
French child singers
French film actresses
French people of English descent
French people of Russian-Jewish descent
Jewish French actresses
Most Promising Actress César Award winners
Officiers of the Ordre des Arts et des Lettres
People from Marylebone
Serge Gainsbourg
21st-century French Jews
21st-century English Jews
English expatriates in the United States
French expatriates in the United States
Collège Alpin International Beau Soleil alumni